Vadakkumnadhan (Lord Shiva) is a 2006 Indian Malayalam-language psychological drama film directed by Shajoon Kariyal and written by Gireesh Puthenchery. It stars Mohanlal as Iringannoor Bharatha Pisharody, a university professor diagnosed with Bipolar disorder, the film also features Padmapriya and Kavya Madhavan. The film's songs were composed by Raveendran, while Ouseppachan provided the background score.

The film is an unusual love story, taken by focusing and refocusing the lens of mental health and tolerance towards it in the society. Vadakkumnadhan released on 19 May 2006 received wide critical acclaim. The film was a commercial success, becoming one of the highest-grossing Malayalam films of the year. It ran for more than 100 days in theatres.

Plot 

Iringannoor Bharatha Pisharody, a professor at the Sanskrit University, is a knowledgeable man with a keen interest in the Vedas, Astrology and Kathakali, author of several critical works regarding Adi Shankara and winner of numerous awards. Meera is his fiancée by birth (murapennu), being the daughter of his maternal uncle Balarama Pisharody, and student. Bharathan is diagnosed with bipolar disorder and he hides it from his family. Due to the same reason he does not encourage Meera's love for him.

Despite of Bharathan's expressed dislike, both families agree to their wedding and dates are fixed. As the auspicious day dawns Bharathan becomes desperate and leaves home. As the bride arrives for the marriage, she and her family realizes to their utter dismay and desolation that the groom has disappeared. Gloom settles over the household. Meera is inconsolable.

Years pass and Bharathan is considered to be dead, because he sent notice as such to his family. He roams around the holy shrines of Haridwar, Kedarnath, Rishikesh and Rudraprayag. Then one day his mother and younger brother on a pilgrimage to the Hindu holy lands accidentally see Bharathan on the banks of the holy Ganges. They convince him to return to his family. His family is happy to have him back. His brother Prabhakan (Biju Menon) is married and his sister Bhama was waiting to be married.

Bharathan does not seem right and people think he is addicted to drugs. He causes a scene in his college and at Bhama's engagement, insulting the groom and his father. Probhakaran loses his cool and breaks his suitcase, only to find his reports from medical college saying that Bharathan suffers from Bipolar Disorder. Bharatan admits to faking a drug addiction to hide his disorder from them. He says it is like slipping while walking, the mind slips from its normal self.

He tells them that he went to Keezhpalli Narayanan Nambeesan and told him about his problem. Like the boat which can carry four people, and suddenly carries 100, is how it feels to have this disorder. His brain is crowded with too many thoughts. He tells Meera that marriage will be a disaster and that is the reason why he decided to run away. Meera tells him that she will take care of him no matter what.

Bharathan sets about making things right. He apologizes at his college and to Bhama's groom asking him to marry her. They agree on the condition that he would not be attending. He agrees and the wedding is arranged. After a lot of struggle, Bharathan convinces Meera's father to give her hand to him in marriage. Bharathan later accepts a position to be Sanskrit professor at the college. The last scene shows them going on a pilgrimage to the Vadukkunathan temple.

Cast

 Mohanlal as Prof. Iringannoor Bharatha Pisharadi 
 Padmapriya as Meera, daughter of Balarama Pisharadi ( voice by Sreeja Ravi )
 Biju Menon as Prabhakara Pisharadi
 Kavya Madhavan as Bhama, sister of Bharathan (voice by Sreeja Ravi )
 Kaviyoor Ponnamma as Rugmavathi Amma, mother of Bharatha Pisharadi
 Babu Namboothiri as astrologer Govinda Pisharadi, maternal uncle of Bharatha Pisharadi
 Murali as Balarama Pisharadi, maternal uncle of Bharatha Pisharadi
 Vineeth as Parameshwaran
 Rizabawa as Shankarankutty Master
 Shammi Thilakan as Vishwanathan
 Madambu Kunjukuttan as Sharmaji
 Sadiq as Gaffoor
 Sona Nair as Latha
 Sreeja Chandran as Lakshmi
 Bindu Ramakrishnan
 Freddy
 Ananthapadmanabhan as Keezhpally Narayanan Nambeesan

Soundtrack

This is the last movie work of Raveendran. The lyrics were penned by Gireesh Puthenchery.

Reception

Box office
The film was a commercial success, becoming one of the highest-grossing Malayalam films of the year. It ran for more than 100 days in theatres.

Awards
Filmfare Awards
 Best Male Playback Singer - Dr. K. J. Yesudas
 Best Female Playback Singer - K. S. Chithra
 Best Music Director - Raveendran (Posthumous)
 Best Lyricist - Gireesh Puthenchery
 Best Script Writer - Gireesh Puthenchery

Asianet Film Awards
 Best Music Director - Raveendran (Posthumous)
 Best Lyricist - Gireesh Puthenchery
 Best Actress - Padmapriya

References

External links

2000s Malayalam-language films
2006 films
2000s musical drama films
Films about bipolar disorder
Indian psychological drama films
Films scored by Raveendran
Indian romantic drama films
Films scored by Ouseppachan
Films directed by Shajoon Kariyal
2000s psychological drama films
2006 romantic drama films
Films shot in Thrissur